Nagan (also Romanized as Nāgān) is a village in Kahnuk Rural District, Irandegan District, Khash County, Sistan and Baluchestan Province, Iran. At the 2006 census, its population was 94, in 24 families.

References 

Populated places in Khash County